The 1942 Chicago Cardinals season was the 23rd season the team was in the league. The team failed to improve on their previous output of 3–7–1, losing eight games. They failed to qualify for the playoffs for the 17th consecutive season.

Schedule

Standings

References

Arizona Cardinals seasons
Chicago Cardinals
Chicago